Jocelyn Roux (born 28 August 1986) is a Swiss professional footballer who last played for FC Wil.

Career
He joined Bellinzona in June 2008 after helping Nyon achieve promotion to the Swiss Challenge League. On 19 May 2010 the 23-year-old forward, joined Lausanne-Sport. Roux subsequently signed for Servette FC before rejoining Lausanne in 2015 and FC Wil in 2016. In March 2017 his contract with FC Wil was cancelled by mutual consent.

References

External links
 Career history at ASF
 

1986 births
Living people
Swiss men's footballers
Association football forwards
Étoile Carouge FC players
FC Stade Nyonnais players
AC Bellinzona players
FC Thun players
FC Lausanne-Sport players
Servette FC players
FC Wil players
Swiss Super League players
Swiss Challenge League players